Ricardo Jorge Ferreira dos Santos (born 1 September 1984), known as Cadinha, is a Portuguese professional footballer who plays for Pedrouços A.C. as a midfielder.

Club career
Born in Matosinhos, Cadinha spent the better part of his career with hometown club Leixões SC, reaching the youth academy at the age of 10. After two loans, he was released on 30 June 2008 and went on to represent, alternating between the Segunda Liga and the third division, Gondomar SC, Boavista F.C. and G.D. Chaves.

Cadinha returned to Leixões in January 2013, with the side still in the second level.

References

External links

1984 births
Living people
Sportspeople from Matosinhos
Portuguese footballers
Association football midfielders
Liga Portugal 2 players
Segunda Divisão players
Leixões S.C. players
A.D. Ovarense players
G.D. Ribeirão players
Gondomar S.C. players
Boavista F.C. players
G.D. Chaves players
Portugal youth international footballers